The 2015 Pro Bowl was the National Football League's all-star game for the 2014 season. It began at 6 pm local time on January 25 at University of Phoenix Stadium in Glendale, Arizona, and it was the first Pro Bowl to be held outside Hawaii since 2010. The game was televised nationally by ESPN.

The game continued the "unconferenced" format that was debuted in the 2014 Pro Bowl. The game was the third Pro Bowl that took place in the same site as that year's Super Bowl. It was also the sixth consecutive year where the Pro Bowl took place prior to the Super Bowl.

Hall of Fame wide receivers Cris Carter and Michael Irvin were selected as the alumni captains of the game. Jason Garrett of the Dallas Cowboys and John Harbaugh of the Baltimore Ravens were the game's coaches. The coaches were to come from the teams with the best record in each conference to lose in the Divisional Round of the 2014–15 NFL playoffs, which has been the convention since the 2010 Pro Bowl. However, the Denver Broncos (the Divisional Round loser with the best record in the AFC) and head coach John Fox mutually agreed to part ways following their playoff loss, so Harbaugh (who coached the Ravens, the other Divisional Round loser from the AFC) was selected instead.

Game format
Two former players drafted players on to the teams. Each were assisted by two player captains and one NFL.com fantasy football champion. Captain Michael Irvin was assisted by player captains DeMarco Murray and Joe Haden while Captain Cris Carter was assisted by player captains J. J. Watt and Antonio Brown.
A two-minute warning was added to the first and third quarters, plus overtime, and the ball switched hands after every quarter/overtime.
Teams were given two timeouts per quarter (instead of the customary three timeouts per half) and if a team only used one timeout in the first or third quarter, they could carry their additional timeout to the next quarter. However, timeouts could not carry over from one half to next or into first overtime.
No kickoffs. A coin toss determined which team is awarded possession first, and the ball was placed on the 25-yard line at the start of each quarter and after scoring plays.
Goal posts were narrowed from 18 feet wide to 14 feet wide.
Extra points were attempted from the 15 yard line.
The rosters consisted of 44 players per squad.
The defense was permitted to play "cover two" and "press" coverage. In the previous years, only "man" coverage was permitted, except for goal line situations.
Beginning at the two-minute mark of every quarter/overtime, if the offense did not gain at least one yard, the clock stopped as if the play were an incomplete pass.
A 35-second and 25-second play clock were used instead of the usual 40-second and 25-second clock.
The game clock did not stop on quarterback sacks outside the final two minutes of regulation.

Summary

Box Score

Roster

Team Carter

Team Irvin

Selected and/or chosen but did not participate

Notes:
(C) signifies the player was selected as a captain
Replacement selection due to injury or vacancy
Injured player; selected but will not participate
Selected but did not play because his team advanced to Super Bowl XLIX (see Pro Bowl "Player Selection" section)
Was invited, but declined; pro-bowl selection does not count because of it

Number of selections per team

References

External links
Official website for the Pro Bowl

Pro Bowl
Pro Bowl
Pro Bowl
Pro Bowl
American football in Arizona
Sports in Glendale, Arizona
January 2015 sports events in the United States
Events in Glendale, Arizona
Sports competitions in Maricopa County, Arizona